The 1917 League Island Marines football team, sometimes referred to as "Mahan's Marines", represented the United States Marine Corps stationed at the League Island Navy Yard in Philadelphia during the 1917 college football season. Former Harvard star Eddie Mahan, a three-time All-American from 1913 to 1915, led the team.

Four League Island players were named to the 1917 All-Service football team: fullback Eddie Mahan (Paul Purman, first team); halfback Johnny Scott (New York Times, 1st team); tackle Corbeau (NYT, first team); and center Lud Wray (NYT, first team).

Schedule

References

League Island Marines
League Island Marines football